Ryan McCarthy is an American football coach. He was  the head football coach at Central Connecticut University from December 2018 through the 2022 season.

Early life
McCarthy, originally from Wilder, VT, earned a B.S. in physical education and played quarterback for SUNY-Cortland.

Coaching career
Macarthy began his coaching career at Siena College in 2003. He then moved to the University of Albany and served as their Offensive coordinator for 13 seasons, leading the Northeast Conference in offense four times and setting numerous offensive records under Head Coach Bob Ford. McCarthy moved to CCSU and became the Offensive coordinator under Pete Rossomando in 2015.  When Rossomando left to join the staff at Rutgers, McCarthy was named CCSU head coach. In his first season as head coach he won the Northeast Conference and led his team to a 11–1 regular season record. The 2020 season was canceled, and then following 4-7 and 2-9 seasons in 2021 and 2022, McCarthy's contract wasn't renewed.

Personal life
McCarthy and his wife Jennifer reside in Simsbury, Connecticut with their three sons.

Head coaching record

References

External links
 Central Connecticut profile

Year of birth missing (living people)
1970s births
Living people
People from Windsor County, Vermont
Players of American football from Vermont
Cortland Red Dragons football players
University at Albany, SUNY alumni
Coaches of American football from Vermont
Siena Saints football coaches
Albany Great Danes football coaches
Central Connecticut Blue Devils football coaches